Xanthippe (5th–4th century BCE) was an ancient Athenian, the wife of Socrates and mother of their three sons: Lamprocles, Sophroniscus, and Menexenus. She was likely much younger than Socrates, perhaps by as much as 40 years.

Name
Xanthippe means "yellow horse", from   "blond" and   "horse". Hers is one of many Greek personal names with a horse theme (cf. Philippos "Friend of Horses", Hippocrates "Horse-tamer", etc.).  The hippos in an ancient Greek name often suggested aristocratic heritage.

One additional reason for thinking Xanthippe's family was socially prominent was that her eldest son was named Lamprocles instead of "Sophroniscus" after Socrates' father Sophroniscus: the ancient Greek custom was to name one's first child after the more illustrious of the two grandfathers. Xanthippe's father is believed to have been named Lamprocles. If he was even more well-established in Athenian aristocracy than was Socrates' father, his name would have been the preferred choice for the name of the first-born son.

Character

Plato's portrayal of Xanthippe in the Phaedo suggests that she was a devoted wife and mother; She is mentioned nowhere else in Plato.  Xenophon, in his Memorabilia, portrays her in much the same light, although he does make Lamprocles complain of her harshness. It is only in Xenophon's Symposium where we have Socrates agree that she is (in Antisthenes' words) "the hardest to get along with of all the women there are." Nevertheless, Socrates adds that he chose her precisely because of her argumentative spirit:

It is the example of the rider who wishes to become an expert horseman: "None of your soft-mouthed, docile animals for me," he says; "the horse for me to own must show some spirit" in the belief, no doubt, if he can manage such an animal, it will be easy enough to deal with every other horse besides. And that is just my case. I wish to deal with human beings, to associate with man in general; hence my choice of wife. I know full well, if I can tolerate her spirit, I can with ease attach myself to every human being else.

Perhaps this picture of Xanthippe originated with the historical Antisthenes, one of Socrates' pupils, since Xenophon initially puts this view into his mouth. Aelian also depicts her as a jealous shrew in his description of an episode in which she tramples underfoot a large and beautiful cake sent to Socrates by Alcibiades.  Diogenes Laërtius tells of other stories involving Xanthippe's supposed bad attitude.

It seems that Xenophon's portrayal of her in his Symposium has been the most influential: Diogenes Laërtius, for example, seems to quote the Symposium passage, though he does not mention Xenophon by name, and the term "Xanthippe" has now come to mean any nagging scolding person, especially a shrewish wife.

Later writers, such as Diogenes Laërtius who cite Aristotle as the earliest source, say that Socrates had a second wife called Myrto.  Plutarch tells of a similar story, reporting that it comes from a work entitled On Good Birth, but he expresses doubt as to whether it was written by Aristotle. In Plutarch's version of the story, Socrates, who was already married, attended to Myrto's financial concerns when she became a widow; this does not entail marriage. We have no more reliable evidence on this issue.

A different account of Xanthippe and Myrto is given in Aristoxenus's Life of Socrates written in the latter part of the fourth century BC that Aristoxenus asserts is based on first-person accounts by his father. This claims that Myrto was his legitimate wife and Xanthippe his mistress, whose child became legitimate.

An unconfirmed anecdote purports that Xanthippe was once so enraged with her husband that she took a chamber pot and poured it out over Socrates' head, which – according to the tale  – the philosopher accepted with the allegory: "After thunder comes the rain."

The widely cited quote from Socrates about Xanthippe, "By all means, marry. If you will get for yourself a good wife, you will be happy forever after; and if by chance you will get a common scold like my Xanthippe — why then you will become a philosopher." is misattributed.

Literary references
In William Shakespeare's The Taming of the Shrew, Petruchio compares Katherina "As Socrates' Xanthippe or a worse" in Act 1 Scene 2. (Read here)

Addison discusses matrimony in The Spectator no. 482, dated Friday 12 September 1712:

The novelist Henry Fielding describes the shrewish Mrs. Partridge thus:

The English Victorian poet Amy Levy wrote a dramatic monologue called "Xantippe".

In his poem "An Acrostic", Edgar Allan Poe makes references to her although he (allegedly purposely) misspells her name and instead writes 'Zantippe'. 

Frank Osbaldistone, the first-person narrator of Rob Roy by Sir Walter Scott (1817), records this event: "While I trembled lest the thunders of their wrath might dissolve in showers like that of Xantippe, Mrs Flyter herself awoke, and began, in a tone of objurgation not unbecoming the philosophical spouse of Socrates, to scold one or two loiterers in her kitchen." (Book 2, Chapter 7)

In Doctor Thorne by Anthony Trollope, the author says of wives 'There may possibly have been a Xantippe here and there, but Imogenes are to be found under every bush.'

Salomon Maimon refers to a woman's "Xanthippe-like character" in Chapter 10 of his autobiography.  ("A widow, celebrated for her superior talents, as well as for her Xanthippe-like character, kept a public house at the extremity of one of the suburbs.  She had a daughter who yielded to her in none of the above-mentioned qualities, and who was indispensable to her in the management of the house. [...]"

In episode 9 of James Joyce's Ulysses ("Scylla and Charybdis") John Eglinton asks Stephen Dedalus, ″What useful discovery did Socrates learn from  Xanthippe?″

In his essay "The Case for Xanthippe" (1960), Robert Graves suggested that the stereotype of Xanthippe as a misguided shrew is emblematic of an ancient struggle between masculinity (rationality, philosophy) and femininity (intuition, poetry), and that the rise of philosophy in Socrates' time has led to rationality and scientific pursuit coming to exercise an unreasonable dominance over human life and culture.

In The Canterbury Tales by Geoffrey Chaucer, "The Tale of the Wyf of Bathe" states:

In popular culture
In the Caius children's book trilogy by Henry Winterfeld, a Greek scholar and teacher by the name of Xanthos is nicknamed "Xanthippus" (after Xanthippe) by his students because of his very demanding and critical conduct.
Xanthippe has a fairly important role in Maxwell Anderson's 1951 play Barefoot in Athens.  In the 1966 Hallmark Hall of Fame television production, she was played by Geraldine Page opposite Peter Ustinov as Socrates.
In Cynthia Ozick's 1997 novel, The Puttermesser Papers, Ruth Puttermesser creates a golem who insists on being called Xanthippe.
A fictional account of Xanthippe's relationship with her husband is presented in the play Xanthippe by the British author and playwright Deborah Freeman. Xanthippe was first produced at the Brockley Jack Theatre, London, in 1999.
Xanthippe plays a minor role in the 2018 videogame Assassin's Creed: Odyssey, in which Socrates states that her argumentative nature is what attracted him to her, rather than her looks.
In the television sitcom, Unbreakable Kimmy Schmidt, Jacqueline White's stepdaughter is called Xanthippe Voorhees.

Honours
Asteroid 156 Xanthippe is named in her honour.

In 1995, P. Naskrecki and R.K. Colwell gave the patronym Xanthippe to a genus of flower mite that inhabits flowers of palms of the genus Socratea and is probably phoretic on the beetles that pollinate the palm.

A species of African white-toothed shrew was described by Wilfred Hudson Osgood in 1910 as Crocidura xantippe, common name "Xanthippe's shrew."

See also
List of speakers in Plato's dialogues

References

External links

5th-century BC Greek people
5th-century BC Greek women
Ancient Athenian women
Family of Socrates
Year of birth unknown
Year of death unknown